François-Xavier de Peretti is a French politician and a member of the MoDem. He is an opposition municipal councillor in Aix-en-Provence

In 2009, he was selected to be the MoDem's candidate in Provence-Alpes-Côte d'Azur for the 2010 regional elections.

References

Year of birth missing (living people)
Living people
French politicians